A. Arunmozhithevan (b 1968) is an Indian politician. He was a Member of Parliament elected from Tamil Nadu, elected to the Lok Sabha from Cuddalore constituency as an Anna Dravida Munnetra Kazhagam candidate in 2014 election.

Political career 
In September 2018, Bharatiya Janata Party's H Raja had accused Arunmozhithevan of encroaching upon a temple land in Thittakudi. Arunmozhithevan criticized Raja and said H Raja as mentally affected, seeking to create communal clashes in the state. Five days after Arunmozhithevan submitted a petition seeking action against H Raja for making baseless allegations against him, the Central Crime Branch said that cases have been registered against the BJP leader H Raja under various sections.

Electoral performance

References 

All India Anna Dravida Munnetra Kazhagam politicians
Living people
India MPs 2014–2019
Lok Sabha members from Tamil Nadu
1969 births
People from Cuddalore district
Tamil Nadu MLAs 2021–2026
Tamil Nadu politicians